

The  is an annual professional wrestling tournament hosted by the DDT Pro-Wrestling (DDT) promotion. It was created by DDT producer Danshoku Dino in August 2017 and later confirmed in November.

After the first edition was held in January 2018, the second edition had to be held in December 2018 while retaining the name "D-Oh Grand Prix 2019". This offset between the tournament title and the year it was actually held persisted until 2021 where the tournament (held between November and December 2021) was entitled "D-Oh Grand Prix 2021 II".

Though DDT also runs the annual King of DDT Tournament, the D-Oh Grand Prix is different in that it is round-robin, whereas the King of DDT is a single-elimination tournament. Like the King of DDT however, the winner of the tournament receives a shot at the KO-D Openweight Championship.

Shuji Ishikawa is the inaugural winner of the tournament; Konosuke Takeshita is the only two-time winner.

Rules
 The matches are fought to one fall with a 30 minutes time limit. The final has no time limit.
 The participants are divided into two blocks, A and B, and fight in a round-robin using a points system; two points for a victory, one point for a draw, and zero points for a loss.
 The winners from the two blocks go on to fight in the final to decide the D-Oh Grand Prix winner.
 The D-Oh Grand Prix winner, assuming they do not already hold the KO-D Openweight Championship, obtain first contendership to the title and receive a title shot.

Tournaments

Results

2018
The 2018 edition of the D-Oh Grand Prix was announced on August 20, 2017 and the participants were later announced on November 23. The tournament ran over eight shows from January 5 to January 28, 2018. This edition included Jiro "Ikemen" Kuroshio from the Wrestle-1 promotion.

2019
The 2019 edition was announced on October 21, 2018 and the participants were later announced on the same day. The tournament ran over nine shows from November 30 until December 30, 2018. The tournament included Go Shiozaki from Pro Wrestling Noah who made his first appearance in a D-Oh Grand Prix as did Shinya Aoki, Sammy Guevara, Mao and Puma King. Because Konosuke Takeshita entered the tournament as the reigning Ironman Heavymetalweight Champion, multiple matches in block B and the finals of the tournament were contested for the title due to its 24/7 rule.

2020
The 2020 tournament was announced on October 29, 2019 and the participants were later announced on the same day. The tournament was held from November 29 until December 28, 2019. This year's edition included Chihiro Hashimoto from the Sendai Girls' Pro Wrestling promotion. Chris Brookes, Yuki Iino, Bull James, Masato Tanaka, Yuki Ueno and Naomi Yoshimura made their first appearance in the tournament.

2021
The 2021 tournament was announced on September 7, 2020, at Get Alive 2020 and the participants were later announced on November 3, at Ultimate Party 2020. The tournament was held from November 22 until December 27, 2020. Making their D-Oh Grand Prix debut were Shunma Katsumata, Makoto Oishi and Jun Akiyama. Daisuke Sasaki was diagnosed with a fractured rib after his first match and had to forfeit his remaining matches.

2021 II
On July 4, 2021, DDT announced the next tournament would be named "D-Oh Grand Prix 2021 II", thus ending the trend of the name not matching the year. This edition ran from November 3 to December 5 and featured only 12 participants. Konosuke Takeshita became the first wrestler to win the D-Oh Grand Prix while holding the KO-D Openweight Championship and the first to win two editions. Kenta Kobashi was the special observer for the tournament.

2022
On August 20, 2022, DDT announced the 2022 edition would have 12 participants. This tournament ran from November 1 to December 4. Like previous year, Kenta Kobashi was the special observer of the tournament.

See also
G1 Climax
Champion Carnival
N-1 Victory
Fire Festival
Ikkitousen Strong Climb
King of Gate

Footnotes

References

External links

Wrestle Universe

DDT Pro-Wrestling
Professional wrestling tournaments